The Eliezah Foundation Initiative is a nonprofit organisation based in Wakiso District, Uganda.  The Organisation supports and invests (pursuing its "Equality" strategy) in Women safety and social entrepreneurship through its Women First Approach, and through partnerships with and support of organizations and agencies important to Women’s Growth And Development. It provides opportunities for women to meet with each other (its "Community Engagement" strategy) through support of events including the Periodic Community Dialogues on Gender And Safety at Community Level, convenings, and Training Workshops. It also conducts local media campaigns (the "Localisation" strategy) to publicize women interventions to end violence through projects such as Emergency GBV Services and HIV partnerships with other local and international Partners, including ViiV Healthcare, Cultural Leaders from Buganda, Bunyoro, and Busoga Kingdoms, Local Media, local government in Uganda, and Government Departments. Its founder is Eliezah Titus Busonga who is now working as the Chief Executive Of Real Health Uganda.

History 
Eliezah Titus created the foundation in 2005 as a Young Peoples organization to fight and advocate for Human and women’s rights  in the Community of Maganjo (now Nansana Municipality). In late 2009 Eliezah Registered the  Foundation with the District Local government and Opened Up A Permanent Office in where the Organisation Resides Now.  In 2018, The Eliezah Foundation registered and acquired the 501 (c) Status in Uganda. 
In July 2020, Janet Nansamba was appointed as the new CEO of the Eliezah Foundation.  She had formerly served as the Masaka District local government Women Empowerment Officer and the Secretary General Of Eliezah Foundation.

References

External links
 Official website

Women's organisations based in Uganda
Non-profit organizations based in Africa
Feminist organizations in Africa
2005 establishments in Uganda
Organizations established in 2005
Women's rights in Uganda